Gerard Bluffs are prominent ice-free bluffs marking the southern extremity of the Miller Range, Antarctica. It was mapped in December 1957, and named by the New Zealand southern party of the Commonwealth Trans-Antarctic Expedition (1956–58) for V. Gerard, an International Geophysical Year scientist at Scott Base in 1957.

References

Cliffs of Oates Land